The 1937 Individual Speedway World Championship was the second edition of the official World Championship to determine the world champion rider.

An attendance of 85,000 (a record for speedway in the United Kingdom at the time) saw Jack Milne win all five races to head an all USA top three on the podium. The track was criticised and was described as being too deep with cinders.

World final
2 September 1937
 London, Wembley Stadium

References

1937
Individual World Championship
Individual Speedway World Championship
Individual Speedway World Championship
Speedway competitions in the United Kingdom